Sant Francesc is a Gothic-style, Roman Catholic church located in Ports de Sant Francesc #10 in the city of Cribs, Valencia, Spain. 

The church was erected in the second half of the 14th century, adjacent to a Franciscan monastery. It consists of a single nave with seven chapels. It formerly abutted the medieval walls to the town.

References 

Francesc
Gothic architecture in the Valencian Community
14th-century Roman Catholic church buildings in Spain